Bill Connon was a Scottish rugby union player. He became the 101st President of the Scottish Rugby Union. He was also a golf administrator in the north-east of Scotland and organised the Northern Open tournament for a number of years.

Rugby Union career

Amateur career

Connon went to Aberdeen Grammar School.

Connon played for Aberdeen GSFP.

Provincial career

Connon played in a trial match organised by North of Scotland District. They split teams into  Maroon ('A') and Blue ('B') jerseys to play off for selection by the district to face the Midlands District in October 1949. Connon was reported by the Aberdeen Press and Journal to have scored 'a gem of a forward try' for the Maroons.

Despite that try he failed to make the XV for the North v Midlands match on 5 November 1949.

Administrative career

Connon became the 101st President of the Scottish Rugby Union. He served the standard one year from 1987 to 1988.

In a notable changeover he took over from another former Aberdeen Grammar school former pupil Doug Smith. Tom Pearson of Howe of Fife and Jimmy McNeill of Hutchesons GSFP were elected Vice-Presidents.

Outside of rugby union

He was a solicitor in Aberdeen, becoming an advocate.

His father was Jacky Connon, an Aberdeen F.C. player of the post-First World War era.

He was a North-East District golf official. He was one of the main organisers of the Northern Open, together with Jack Hall.

References

1920s births
2000 deaths
Scottish rugby union players
Presidents of the Scottish Rugby Union
Rugby union players from Aberdeen
Aberdeen GSFP RFC players
Rugby union forwards